The 1983 European Tour was the 12th official season of golf tournaments known as the PGA European Tour and organised by the Professional Golfers' Association.

The season was made up of 27 tournaments counting for the Order of Merit, and some non-counting "Approved Special Events".

The Official Money List was won by England's Nick Faldo, who won five tournaments during the season.

Changes for 1983
There were several changes from the previous season, with the addition of the Timex Open and the Glasgow Golf Classic, and the loss of the Welsh Golf Classic. A new Welsh Open was scheduled, to replace the classic, but cancelled prior to the start of the season.

Schedule
The following table lists official events during the 1983 season.

Unofficial events
The following events were sanctioned by the European Tour, but did not carry official money, nor were wins official.

Official money list
The official money list was based on prize money won during the season, calculated in Pound sterling.

Awards

See also
List of golfers with most European Tour wins

Notes

References

External links
1983 season results on the PGA European Tour website
1983 Order of Merit on the PGA European Tour website

European Tour seasons
European Tour